Events from the year 1536 in Sweden

Incumbents
 Monarch – Gustav I

Events

 29 August - Armistice between Sweden and Lübeck in Copenhagen: the Swedish debt to Lübeck is no longer valid. 
 1 October - Marriage between the monarch and Margaret Leijonhufvud.
 2 October - Coronation of the queen. 
 - The Church of Sweden is made official church of the state, and the mass is to be given in the Swedish language in all of the Kingdom. 
 - Several members of the burgher class is arrested in Stockholm and Kalmar and executed in a suspected plot against the king.

Births

Deaths

 31 December - Margareta Eriksdotter Vasa, the sister of the king  (born 1497)

References

 
Years of the 16th century in Sweden
Sweden